The Kuala Belait Port, also known as Kuala Belait Wharf, is a port operated by both the Brunei Shell Petroleum (BSP) and Maritime and Port Authority Brunei Darussalam (MPABD). The port can only accommodate low-draught ships. It is one of the only three existing ports in the country.

Geography 
The port sits at the east bank of the Belait River, opposite of Sungai Teraban and not far from the District's capital Kuala Belait. Kuala Belait port is also one of the closest sea facility from Sarawak, Malaysia. It can also be noted that only Muara Port and Kuala Belait Port provided shipping to Hong Kong, Singapore and other parts of Asia. The location allowed ships to have full access to the South China Sea.

History 
The Royal Brunei Navy held an Open Ship & Career Exhibition at the port on December 15, 2007. On September 30, 2021, the MPABD building in the government wharf was lit up blue in conjunction to the World Maritime Day.

Facilities 
There are several designated areas and facilities within the two different sections of the port:

Brunei Shell Petroleum wharf 
 Five  cranes
 A  derrick

Government wharf 
 A  crane
 Warehouse and storage facilities

References

External links

Marinetraffic

Establishments in Brunei
Belait District
Ports and harbours in Southeast Asia